Qari Saifullah Akhtar (died 9 January 2017) was an alleged member of Al-Qaeda who was in Pakistani custody a few times prior to his death. Akhtar, a graduate of Jamia Uloom-ul-Islamia in Karachi, had been the leader of Harkat-ul-Jihad-al-Islami (HUJI), a jihadi organization. He was a key figure and founder of HUJI and was involved in jihadi groups since the early 1980s. He was appointed the head of HUJI following the killing of Mawlana Irshad Ahmed at Sharana during clashes with Soviet forces in June 1985. He was reportedly involved in the 1995 coup attempt to topple the Pakistani government led by Benazir Bhutto. When HUJI merged with Harkat-ul-Mujahideen (HUM) around 1990 to form Harkat-ul-Ansar (HUA), Akhtar acted as deputy to former HUM leader and then amir Maulana Fazalur Rehman Khalil.  HUA dissolved back into two separate groups in 1997, allowing Akhtar to become amir of HUJI.  Since 1998 when Osama bin Laden released a fatwa under the banner World Islamic Front for Jihad Against the Jews and Crusaders, segments of HUJI have joined al-Qaeda.  It has been reported that Akhtar was running a training camp at Rishkhor, Afghanistan before the US invaded Afghanistan in 2001, and had trained 3,500 persons in conventional and unconventional combat. He disappeared from Afghanistan but was apprehended in August 2004 in the United Arab Emirates. He was then handed over to Pakistan.

A petition was filed in the Supreme Court by Akhtar's brother-in-law, Abdur Rehman Mahmood, on October 12, 2004, challenging Akhtar's arrest and seeking his appearance before the court.  The petitioner also sought a court order to prevent possible deportation of Akhtar to another country.  The petition was thrown out on January 18, 2005.  The petitioner was instructed to move the High Court by filing a habeas corpus writ petition.  "You first invoke the jurisdiction of a high court and if it gets dismissed there only then you come to the top court," said Justice Falak Sher.  "We can’t entertain a direct writ petition at this stage."  However, the bench, consisting of Javed Iqbal and Mian Shakirullah Jan, ordered the government to submit comprehensive replies in the cases of several people, including that of Akhtar, who had been arrested on suspicion of terrorism.

On May 21, 2007, Akhtar reached his hometown of Mandi Bahauddin, after reportedly being released by an intelligence agency earlier that morning.  The Daily Times reported, "He was thrown out of a car in a deserted area near Chakwal."

According to the Dawn newspaper, Akhtar was arrested in Lahore on February 26, 2008 for his alleged involvement in the attempted assassination of Benazir Bhutto in Karachi on October 18, 2007.  "He is involved in the blasts in Karsaz. Therefore he has been arrested," Interior Minister Hamid Nawaz told The Associated Press, referring to the area in Karachi where the bombing happened. Mr. Nawaz added that three other men, identified by Akhtar as his sons, were also arrested.

Akhtar was ordered freed from custody March 26, 2008 for lack of evidence. That September he was suspected to be involved in the Islamabad Marriott Hotel bombing.

Akhtar was re-arrested in August 2010 after he was injured in a drone strike but was re-released four months later.

The Afghan National Directorate of Security confirmed that Akhtar was killed in a raid in Nawa District, Ghazni Province on 9 January 2017. However, Pakistani press reported that he was killed in Barmal District, Paktika Province the same day.

He was sanctioned as a Specially Designated Global Terrorist under the Specially Designated Nationals and Blocked Persons List by the United States Department of the Treasury's Office of Foreign Assets Control; his year of birth being listed as either 1964 or from 1963 to 1965, with a place of birth in Daraz Jaldak, Qalat District, Zabul Province, Afghanistan and a citizenship of Afghanistan and further address in Quetta, Pakistan. He is from the Tokhi tribe of Pashtuns while his title qari means a reciter of Quran.

References

External links
 "Profile of Qari Saifullah Akhtar"

Pakistani al-Qaeda members
2017 deaths
Year of birth uncertain
Afghan Islamists
People from Zabul Province
Specially Designated Nationals and Blocked Persons List
Individuals designated as terrorists by the United States government
Leaders of Islamic terror groups
1960s births
Pashtun people